Fritz Albert Erich "Ete" Rademacher (9 June 1901 – 2 April 1979) was a German breaststroke swimmer and water polo goalkeeper who competed at the 1928 and 1932 Olympics. In 1928 he was a member of the German team that won the gold medal, he also won a silver medal in the 200 m breaststroke. Four years later he won another silver medal with the German water polo team. His younger brother Joachim was his teammate in both water polo tournaments.

At the European championships Rademacher won two gold medals in swimming (1926–1927) and two medals in water polo (1926 and 1931). He set world records in 1920, 1921, 1923, 1925 and 1926 in the 400 m breaststroke, in 1922 and 1927 in the 200 m breaststroke, in 1924 in the 200 yards breaststroke, and in 1925 in the 100 and 500 m breaststrokes. He also set 15 national records and appeared in 42 international water polo matches. He missed the 1920 and 1924 Olympics because Germany was not allowed to compete there.

Rademacher toured the United States in 1926 and Japan in 1927 as an exhibition swimmer. During World War II he fought against Russia, was captured, and remained in a prison camp until 1947. During that period he suffered a permanent face injury and did not like to be photographed afterwards. After returning to Germany he worked as an insurance clerk in Braunschweig and then in Stuttgart. 

Rademacher was inducted into the International Swimming Hall of Fame in 1972 and into the Germany's Sports Hall of Fame in 2008. A street and an indoor swimming pool in Magdeburg are named after him. His son Ulrich won 11 German swimming titles in 1954–58 and set 37 national records, and his another son Peter played for the German water polo team.

See also
 Germany men's Olympic water polo team records and statistics
 List of Olympic medalists in swimming (men)
 List of Olympic medalists in water polo (men)
 List of Olympic champions in men's water polo
 List of men's Olympic water polo tournament goalkeepers
 List of members of the International Swimming Hall of Fame

References

External links

 

1901 births
1979 deaths
Sportspeople from Magdeburg 
German male breaststroke swimmers
German male water polo players
Water polo goalkeepers
Water polo players at the 1928 Summer Olympics
Water polo players at the 1932 Summer Olympics
Swimmers at the 1928 Summer Olympics
Olympic water polo players of Germany
Olympic swimmers of Germany
Olympic gold medalists for Germany
Olympic silver medalists for Germany
World record setters in swimming
Olympic medalists in water polo
European Aquatics Championships medalists in swimming
Medalists at the 1932 Summer Olympics
Medalists at the 1928 Summer Olympics
Olympic silver medalists in swimming
Olympic gold medalists in swimming
20th-century German people